High School Old Boys is a rugby union football club based in Christchurch, New Zealand.  The club was founded in 1900 by former students of Christchurch Boys' High School (CBHS).  While many members are former CBHS students, High School Old Boys is an open club accepting both male and female players.  The club is affiliated with the Canterbury Rugby Football Union.

History

Name 
The official name of the club is the "Christchurch High School Old Boys RFC". This is generally shortened to "High School Old Boys" (H.S.O.B) and the club is commonly referred to simply as "Old Boys" or the "Polar Bears" due to their full white playing uniform and notoriously cold home fields.

Location 
High School Old Boys clubrooms are located at 5 Ayr St, Riccarton, Christchurch, and the Bob Deans Playing Fields are in Hagley Park.

Colours 
Old Boys colours are: White jersey, white shorts and black socks with blue tops

All Blacks coaches from HSOB 
 Graham Henry, former All Blacks coach
 Steve Hansen, current All Blacks coach

Notable players

All Blacks 
A number of New Zealand representatives, called All Blacks, have been selected for international duties while affiliated to the club. Before the advent of professionalism in 1996, international players would appear for their clubs regularly in New Zealand, but since the introduction of Super Rugby, most professional players play for their clubs only rarely.
 Bob Deans
 Harry Taylor
 Cyril Evans
 Bill Dalley
 Jim Parker
 Jack Harris
 Sid Carleton
 Frank Clark
 George Mehrtens
 Jack Rankin
 Don Cobden
 Doug Wilson
 Pat Vincent
 John Graham
 John Morrissey
 Tony Steel
 Clive Currie
 Richard Loe
 Graeme Bachop
 Andrew Mehrtens
 Justin Marshall
 Daryl Gibson
 Reuben Thorne
 Nathan Mauger
 Aaron Mauger
 Daniel Carter
Luke Romano
 Mitchell Drummond
 George Bridge

Super Rugby 
CRUSADERS

 Stephen Brett
 Daniel carter
 George bridge 2017
 Reed Prinsep
 Ben Funnell
 Mitchell Drummond
 Daniel Lienert-Brown

Hurricanes 
 Reed Prinsep

Highlanders
 Daniel Lienert-Brown

Canterbury 
 Craig Clarke

Japan 
 Philip O'Reilly

External links 
 Old Boys Official Website

New Zealand rugby union teams
Sport in Christchurch